Duncan Davidson of Tulloch FRSE (1800 – 18 September 1881) was a Scottish landowner, soldier and politician.

Life

He was the first son of Caroline Elizabeth Diffel and Henry Davidson of Tulloch, DL (1771–1827). He was grandson of Duncan Davidson (1733–1799), and succeeded to his father's Scottish estates, including Tulloch Castle. He was educated at Harrow then studied law at the University of Edinburgh. In 1820 he worked as a lawyer in Lincoln's Inn in London. From then until at least 1823 he lived at the family's London home at 10 Cavendish Square in London. In 1827 on his father's death, he inherited Tulloch Castle, Inchicore near Dublin, stocks and shares in various canals and the Mount Gay sugar plantation in Grenada. He then became a soldier and served as a lieutenant in the Grenadier Guards.

He represented Cromartyshire for two sessions in Parliament (1826-1830). Both terms being prior to the Scottish Reform Act 1832, he was elected by his own peers.

In 1843 he was elected a Fellow of the Royal Society of Edinburgh, his proposer being Sir George Steuart Mackenzie. He later served as Lord Lieutenant of Ross-shire from 1879 to his death, in Edinburgh on 18 September 1881.

Family

He married five times: firstly in 1825 to Elizabeth Diana Macdonald (d.1839); secondly in 1841 to Eleanora Fergusson (d.1845); thirdly in 1846 to Arabella Ross (d.1847); fourth in 1849 to Mary Mackenzie (d.1867, his longest surviving wife); lastly in 1877 to Sarah Justine Taylor (who outlived him).

He was succeeded in ownership of Tulloch Castle by his eldest son Duncan Henry Caithness Reay Davidson (1836–1889).

References

 David R. Fisher, DAVIDSON, Duncan (?1800-1881), of Tulloch Castle, Dingwall, Ross. in The History of Parliament: the House of Commons 1820-1832 (2009).

1881 deaths
Alumni of the University of Edinburgh
Members of Lincoln's Inn
19th Light Dragoons officers
Grenadier Guards officers
Coldstream Guards officers
Members of the Parliament of the United Kingdom for Scottish constituencies
UK MPs 1826–1830
UK MPs 1831–1832
Year of birth unknown
Year of birth uncertain
People educated at Harrow School